Abigail "Aby" King (born 1 March 1977) is a British novelist best known as the author of the Adventures of a Royal Dog fantasy series. The first book in the series, Lupo & The Secret of Windsor Castle, was released on 4 September 2014, published by Hodder Children's Books. There are currently four books planned within the series, which is based on The Duke and Duchess of Cambridge's cocker spaniel, Lupo.

Biography
Aby King was born in London, to Lynda and Tom King. She was raised in Wimbledon Village with her half sister Louise and brother Oliver. She came up with the idea for the Lupo series whilst walking her dog Lilly around Kensington Palace. She is married to Malte Richter and they share their home with two cocker spaniel dogs called Lilly and Maggy.

Aby has had what you might describe as a ‘portfolio’ career. She has been an actress, a model, a TV presenter, a PA and a businesswoman – but always wanted to be a writer. At school she was inspired by Enid Blyton's The Magic Faraway Tree and scribbled fantasy and adventure stories.

In 1991, when Abigail was 14, her mother died of leukemia. The following year, her half-sister, the model and actress Louise Ashby, was seriously injured in a car crash in Los Angeles. The story of her long and painful recovery is told in her 2001 book The Magic of the Mask. In 2008 Aby's then fiancé Mark Sebire (property developer) committed suicide.

Like Louise and her mother, Abigail has a background in the expressive arts. Aged 18, she wrote, produced and directed A Simple Girl for the BBC Short Film Festival. She then went on to find work as a model and actress. A keen amateur chef, she appeared as a contestant on Hell's Kitchen in 2005. She has featured in a number of television commercials, most notably Vodafone with David Beckham, Waitrose with Heston Blumenthal, The Bill and NSPCC (charity).

Aby supports a number of charitable organisations including the NSPCC,  Cruse Bereavement and The Mayhew Animal Home.

Books

The Adventures of a Royal Dog
 Lupo and the Secret of Windsor Castle (2014)
 Lupo and the Curse at Buckingham Palace (2015)
 Lupo and the Thief at the Tower of London 
 Lupo and the Labyrinth of the Lost Pirate of Kensington Palace (2016)

References

External links

1977 births
Living people
21st-century British novelists
British women novelists
21st-century British women writers
Writers from London
British children's writers
British women children's writers